Events from the 1130s in England.

Incumbents
Monarch – Henry I (to 1 December 1135), then Stephen

Events
 1130
 New choir of Canterbury Cathedral completed.
 1131
 8 September – the barons swear allegiance to Matilda as the true heir of Henry I of England.
Cistercians found Rievaulx Abbey in Yorkshire.
 Gilbertine Order of nuns founded by Gilbert of Sempringham in Lincolnshire, the only completely English religious order.
 1132
Benedictines found Fountains Abbey in Yorkshire.
 1133
 August – King Henry I leaves England for the last time for Normandy.
 A royal charter establishes the first annual Bartholomew Fair at Smithfield, London; later to become England's largest cloth fair.
 First Bishop of Carlisle (Æthelwold) consecrated.
 Rebuilt Exeter Cathedral consecrated.
 1135 
 26 May – the Great Fire of 1135 destroys the wooden London Bridge and seriously damages St Paul's Cathedral.
 1 December – King Henry I dies (at Lyons-la-Forêt in Normandy) having nominated Matilda as his heir.
 22 December – Stephen of Blois, nephew of Henry I, claims the throne.
 26 December – coronation of Stephen of England at Westminster Abbey by William de Corbeil, Archbishop of Canterbury.
 Bruton Abbey, Buildwas Abbey and Byland Abbey founded, the latter in January by the Congregation of Savigny.
 1136
 1 January – revolt in Wales; Welsh capture Swansea and Cardigan from the Normans.
 4 January – Henry I is buried in his foundation, Reading Abbey (tomb dedicated 1 December).
 5 February – by the Treaty of Durham, Stephen concedes Cumberland to David I of Scotland.
 Hospital of St Cross, an almshouse in Winchester, is established by Bishop Henry of Blois; it will still be functioning in the 21st century.
 Geoffrey of Monmouth writes Historia Regum Britanniae.
 1137
 March – Stephen fails in his attempt to re-capture Normandy from Matilda.
 3 June – a fire severely damages Rochester Cathedral, but it is soon rebuilt.
 4 June – a fire destroys much of the city of York, including 39 churches and York Minster, but the latter is soon rebuilt.
 27 June – a fire severely damages the city of Bath, Somerset.
 1138
 January–February – King David I of Scotland raids Northumberland, taking the Bishop of Durham's Norham Castle (garrisoned only by nine), and besieges the castle at Wark on Tweed.
 10 April – Robert Warelwast is nominated as Bishop of Exeter.
 May – The Anarchy: Robert, 1st Earl of Gloucester, leads a rebellion against King Stephen in favour of his half-sister Matilda.
 10 June – Battle of Clitheroe: Having harried Craven in Yorkshire, David I of Scotland's nephew William fitz Duncan meets and defeats an English force on the edge of the Bowland Fells.
 22 August – Battle of the Standard: English army defeats that of David I of Scotland at Cowton Moor near Northallerton in Yorkshire.
 December – Legatine conference in Westminster led by Alberic of Ostia.
 Alcester Abbey and Bourne Abbey established.
 1139
 8 January – Theobald of Bec enthroned as Archbishop of Canterbury.
 9 April – the second Treaty of Durham between King Stephen of England and David I of Scotland; David's son Earl Henry takes control of most of Northumberland, excluding Bamburgh and Newcastle upon Tyne.
 June – Stephen orders the arrest of Roger of Salisbury, Justiciar and Bishop of Salisbury, and Alexander of Lincoln, Bishop of Lincoln.
 30 September – The Anarchy: Empress Matilda lands near Arundel to begin her campaign to regain the throne from Stephen.
 7 November – The Anarchy: Gloucester's army sacks Worcester.
 King's School, Pontefract, founded.

Births
 1130
Richard de Clare, 2nd Earl of Pembroke (died 1176)
 1133
 5 March – King Henry II of England (died 1189)
 1136
William of Newburgh, historian (died c. 1198)

Deaths
 year unknown, after 1130
Robert of Bellême, 3rd Earl of Shrewsbury (born 1052) 
 1130
Maud, Countess of Huntingdon (born 1074)
 1134
 28 March – Stephen Harding, Abbot of Cîteaux and saint (born c. 1050)
 Biddenden Maids, supposed earliest known conjoined twins (born 1100)
 1135
 1 December – King Henry I of England (born c. 1068)
 1136
 15 April – Richard de Clare, 1st Earl of Hertford (born 1094)
 21 November – William de Corbeil, Archbishop of Canterbury (born c. 1070 in the Île-de-France)
 1137
 10 July – Pain fitzJohn, nobleman and royal administrator (killed in ambush)
 c. 26 September – William Warelwast, Bishop of Exeter and diplomat
 1138
 11 May – William de Warenne, 2nd Earl of Surrey
 1139
 11 December – Roger of Salisbury, bishop and Lord Chancellor

References